Andrew Mosley (1885 – 3 August 1917) was an English professional footballer who made over 160 appearances in the Southern League for Gillingham as a right back. He also played in the Football League for Notts County.

Personal life 
Mosley worked as a bricklayer and was married with a child. He served as a private with the Royal Engineers and the South Wales Borderers during the First World War and was killed in West Flanders on 3 August 1917. He is commemorated on the Menin Gate.

Career statistics

Notes
a.  The club changed its name in 1912.

References

1885 births
1917 deaths
Footballers from Nottingham
English footballers
English Football League players
Association football fullbacks
British Army personnel of World War I
Royal Engineers soldiers
British military personnel killed in World War I
South Wales Borderers soldiers
Carlton Town F.C. players
Notts County F.C. players
British bricklayers
Southern Football League players
Gillingham F.C. players
People from Sneinton
Footballers from Nottinghamshire
20th-century British businesspeople
Military personnel from Nottingham